Moldova competed at the 2000 Summer Olympics in Sydney, Australia.

Medalists

Results by event

Athletics

Men's Competition
Men's 800m
 Vitalie Cercheș
 Round 1 – 01:52.15 (did not advance)

Men's 400m Hurdles
 Vadim Zadoinov
 Round 1 – 51.08 (did not advance)

Men's 3,000m Steeplechase
 Iaroslav Musinschi
 Round 1 – 08:42.04 (did not advance)

Men's Shot Put
 Ivan Emelianov
 Qualifying – 17.63 (did not advance)

Men's Hammer Throw
 Roman Rozna
 Qualifying – 68.01 (did not advance)

Men's 20 km Walk
 Efim Motpan
 Final – DNF

Men's 50 km Walk
 Fedosei Ciumacenco
 Final – DQ

Men's Marathon
 Valeriu Vlas
 Final – 2:24:35 (55th place)

Women's Competition
Women's High Jump
 Inna Gliznutza
 Qualifying – 1.89 (did not advance)

 Olga Bolșova
 Qualifying – 1.85 (did not advance)

Women's Marathon
 Valentina Enachi
 Final – DNF

Boxing

Men's Welterweight (– 67 kg)
Vitalie Grușac
Round 1 – Defeated Tsegasellase Aregawi of Ethiopia
Round 2 – Defeated Sherzod Husanov of Uzbekistan
Quarterfinal – Defeated Bulent Ulusoy of Turkey
Semifinal – Lost to Sergey Dotsenko of Ukraine – Bronze medal

Swimming

Men's Competition

Women's Competition

Weightlifting

Men

References

sports-reference
Wallechinsky, David (2004). The Complete Book of the Summer Olympics (Athens 2004 Edition). Toronto, Canada. .
International Olympic Committee (2001). The Results. Retrieved 12 November 2005.
Sydney Organising Committee for the Olympic Games (2001). Official Report of the XXVII Olympiad Volume 1: Preparing for the Games. Retrieved 20 November 2005.
Sydney Organising Committee for the Olympic Games (2001). Official Report of the XXVII Olympiad Volume 2: Celebrating the Games. Retrieved 20 November 2005.
Sydney Organising Committee for the Olympic Games (2001). The Results. Retrieved 20 November 2005.
International Olympic Committee Web Site

Nations at the 2000 Summer Olympics
2000
Olympics